William George "Billy" Weichel (July 20, 1870 – May 2, 1949) was a merchant and political figure in Ontario, Canada. He represented Waterloo North in the House of Commons of Canada from 1911 to 1917 as a Conservative member and in the Legislative Assembly of Ontario from 1923 to 1929.

Biography 
He was born in Elmira, Ontario, the son of Michael Weichel, who came to Canada from Hesse, Germany, and Margaret Schmidt. Weichel was educated in Elmira and Berlin (later Kitchener). He worked eight years as a clerk in his father's hardware store before becoming a salesman for a saw manufacturer in Galt. In 1896, Weichel opened a hardware store with other members of his family in Waterloo, later becoming sole owner. Weichel was also director for several insurance companies. In 1898, he married Jessie Rose Kinsman. He defeated William Lyon Mackenzie King to win a seat in the federal parliament in 1911. Weichel was defeated in a bid for reelection to the federal seat as a Unionist candidate in 1917. Weichel served as mayor of Waterloo from 1922 to 1923. He was unsuccessful in the provincial elections of 1929 and 1934. He died in Kitchener at the age of 78.

References

External links
Member's parliamentary history for the Legislative Assembly of Ontario

1870 births
1949 deaths
Progressive Conservative Party of Ontario MPPs
Conservative Party of Canada (1867–1942) MPs
Members of the House of Commons of Canada from Ontario
Mayors of Waterloo, Ontario
Canadian Lutherans
People from Woolwich, Ontario
Canadian people of German descent